Congregation Agudath Sholom (CAS) is a historic Jewish synagogue in Stamford, Connecticut. The original synagogue building was later converted into a Christian church building, the  Faith Tabernacle Missionary Baptist Church.

It's one of multiple synagogues considered in a study of NRHP eligibility.

History 
The Agudath Sholom congregation website states that on September 7, 1889, twenty-two members formally declared themselves as "Agudath Sholom Synagogue"; meaning "knot for peace" or "society for peace". The congregation constructed their first synagogue, the Greyrock Synagogue, from 1904 through 1908. The congregation used the building until February 1932 when the Greyrock Synagogue was destroyed in a fire.

In order to meet the demands of its growing congregation, funds were raised for a new synagogue. A fund raiser for $1.2 million was done to raise the necessary capital; it was announced that $860,000 was made by February 1963.
In 1965, the congregation completed and dedicated a new synagogue on Strawberry Hill Avenue and Colonial Road. The synagogue currently resides at 301 Strawberry Hill Avenue. The Faith Tabernacle Missionary Baptist Church now uses the Grove St synagogue.

Construction 

Located at 29 Grove Street in Stamford, Connecticut, the Agudath Sholom Synagogue was the second synagogue of the congregation. According to the National Register of Historic Places, the ground breaking occurred on September 12, 1933, and the final dedication was on April 27, 1941. According to the congregation's website, the Agudath Sholom Synagogue was completed in 1938 and the "Chanukkat Habayit dedication occurred on the High Holidays". The construction delayed by funding difficulties that resulted from the Great Depression. The synagogue is a rectangular brick building constructed on a high basement. The building features a prominent rose window depicting the Star of David.

Significance 
While it was originally a synagogue, the Faith Tabernacle Missionary Baptist Church continues to use the building as a church, but this did not impact the "National Landmark" status bestowed upon the building. For the National Register of Historic Places, it was submitted under Criterion C because it was "Constructed as a Jewish house of worship, located in an urban setting, exhibits integrity of design and workmanship and constructed prior to 1945."

See also
Ahavas Sholem Synagogue, New Haven, listed on the NRHP in New Haven County, Connecticut
Ohev Sholem Synagogue, New London, listed on the NRHP in New London County, Connecticut
National Register of Historic Places listings in Stamford, Connecticut

External links

 Agudath Sholom Synagogue Website
 Faith Tabernacle Website

References

Former synagogues in Connecticut
Buildings and structures in Stamford, Connecticut
Churches in Stamford, Connecticut
Baptist churches in Connecticut
National Register of Historic Places in Fairfield County, Connecticut
Synagogues on the National Register of Historic Places in Connecticut
1908 establishments in Connecticut
Synagogues completed in 1908
Romanesque Revival architecture in Connecticut
Romanesque Revival synagogues